Ahlberg or Åhlberg is a surname. Notable people with the surname include:

Alf Ahlberg (1892–1979), Swedish writer, humanist and philosopher
Bruno Ahlberg (1911–1966), Finnish boxer
Flemming Ahlberg (born 1946), Danish footballer
Gillis Ahlberg (1892–1930), Swedish rower
Hakon Ahlberg (1891–1984), Swedish architect, editor and author
Janet and Allan Ahlberg (born 1944 and 1938), British children's book illustrator and writer, commonly as a married duo
 Jessica Ahlberg (born 1979 or 1980), British children's book illustrator and writer, sometimes in collaboration with her father
Mac Ahlberg (born 1931), Swedish film director and cinematographer
Mats Åhlberg (born 1947), Swedish ice hockey player
Per E. Ahlberg, Swedish vertebrate palaentologist